Costel Coşniţă (born 16 April 1943) is a Romanian sprint canoeist who competed in the early to mid-1970s. He won five medals at the ICF Canoe Sprint World Championships with a gold (K-4 10000 m: 1971), a silver (K-4 10000 m: 1975), and three bronzes (K-2 1000 m: 1971, K-2 10000 m: 1970, K-4 10000 m: 1973.

Coşniţă also finished fifth in the K-2 1000 m event at the 1972 Summer Olympics in Munich.

References

1943 births
Canoeists at the 1972 Summer Olympics
Living people
Olympic canoeists of Romania
Romanian male canoeists
ICF Canoe Sprint World Championships medalists in kayak